Minamitaniguchi Dam  is an earthfill dam located in Hyogo Prefecture in Japan. The dam is used for flood control and irrigation. The catchment area of the dam is 0.6 km2. The dam  can store 76 thousand cubic meters of water. The construction of the dam was started on 1992 and completed in 1994.

See also
List of dams in Japan

References

Dams in Hyogo Prefecture